Ronnel "Nel" Rivera (born September 1, 1971) is a Filipino politician, entrepreneur, businessman, and former city councilor (2010–2013) and mayor of General Santos (2013–2022). In the 2022 elections, he ran for the position as the first-ever lone representative of General Santos, but lost to his vice mayor Loreto Acharon. He is the son of Rodrigo E. Rivera Sr. the owner of RD Pawnshop Inc., one of the largest pawnshop company in the Philippines.

References

External links
 Official Website of the City of General Santos
 Official Website of Sangguniang Panglungsod of the City of General Santos
 Website of Ronnel Rivera

1971 births
Living people
United Nationalist Alliance politicians
People's Champ Movement politicians
People from General Santos
Mayors of places in South Cotabato
Filipino city and municipal councilors
University of San Carlos alumni
University of the Philippines Diliman alumni